Widewater may refer to:

Widewater, Alberta, a hamlet in Canada
Widewater, Virginia, an unincorporated community in the United States
Widewater Beach, Virginia, an unincorporated community in the United States